Jesenwang is a municipality in the district of Fürstenfeldbruck in Bavaria in Germany. Its name was recorded as Oasinwanc during the Early Medieval period.

References

Fürstenfeldbruck (district)